Sixty-nine Guggenheim Fellowships were awarded in 1944, including thirteen women, the highest number of female recipients ever.

1944 U.S. and Canadian Fellows

1944 Latin American and Caribbean Fellows

See also
 Guggenheim Fellowship
 List of Guggenheim Fellowships awarded in 1943
 List of Guggenheim Fellowships awarded in 1945

References

1944
1944 awards